Morganella is a genus of scale insects in the family Diaspididae. Morganella longispina is the type species.

It is named for Albert C. F. Morgan, the entomologist who first described the type species in 1889 (as Aspidiotus longispina).

Species 
 Morganella acaciae Munting, 1967
 Morganella barbatissima Takagi, 2007
 Morganella conspicua Brain, 1919
 Morganella cueroensis Cockerell, 1899
 Morganella longispina Morgan, 1889
 Morganella polyctena Takagi, 2003
 Morganella pseudospinigera Balachowsky, 1956
 Morganella spinigera Lindinger, 1909

Other species formerly Morganella 
 Morganella vuilleti or Morganella vuilletti now Sudanaspis vuilleti Marchal, 1909

Takagi has suggested that the other African species, M. acaciae, M. conspicua, M. pseudospinigera  and M. spinigera, as well as the anomalous Morganella cueroensis, do not belong in Morganella.

Notes

References

External links 

Aspidiotina
Sternorrhyncha genera